Stengrund  is a Swedish island belonging to the Kalix archipelago. It is located within the boundary of the Kalix Archipelago Nature Reserve. The island has no shore connection and is unbuilt/uninhabited.

References 

Islands of Norrbotten County
Uninhabited islands of Sweden